The Penske PC-26 was designed by Nigel Bennett and manufactured by Penske Cars in Poole, Dorset, for the 1997 CART Championship. Whilst a development of the PC-25, the PC-26 was designed to address the twitchy nature of the previous year's car.

Five chassis were produced and driven by Al Unser Jr. and Paul Tracy. The Ilmor-produced 850 bhp Mercedes-Benz IC108D engine served as the powerplant, driving through an Xtrac gearbox within a Penske housing. Aerodynamic changes from the previous year's car included revised sidepod inlets and a longer, sharper nose. The Delco Gen V electronics package was carried over from 1996 and remained a Penske-exclusive system.

The PC26 proved to be a formidable short oval car, Paul Tracy recorded three victories in Rio, Nazareth and Gateway. The victory at Gateway marked the 99th for the team and the final victory for a Penske Cars-produced chassis. Penske Racing would have to wait three years to gain its 100th victory. The latter part of the season saw a variety of problems including an eye problem for Tracy as well as a lack of raw pace.

Complete CART World Series results
(key) (Results in bold indicate pole position; results in italics indicate fastest lap)

References

American Championship racing cars
Team Penske